Sounds of Heaven is the sixth studio album by Christian singer-songwriter Kathy Troccoli. It was released on September 26, 1995 on Reunion Records. After the limited mainstream success of her two previous albums Pure Attraction (1991) and the self-titled 1994 release, Troccoli returns with her first full-length Christian album since 1986's Images. American singer-songwriter Chris Rice has penned three songs on Sounds of Heaven including the lead single "Go Light Your World." The song was nominated for Pop/Contemporary Song of the Year, in addition to Troccoli's nomination for Female Vocalist of the Year at the 26th GMA Dove Awards. The album peaked at number 10 on the Top Christian Albums and number 17 on the Heatseekers charts in Billboard magazine.

Track listing 
"I Will Choose Christ" (Kathy Troccoli, Tom Booth) - 4:27
"That's How Much I Love You" (Dawn Thomas) - 2:53
"Go Light Your World" (Chris Rice) - 4:07
"Sounds of Heaven" (Troccoli, Bill Cuomo, Robert White Johnson) - 4:34
"Hallelujahs" (Rice) - 3:50
"I'm Gonna Fight for You" (Troccoli, Cuumo, Johnson) - 3:54
"Each Moment" (Troccoli, Bill Montvilo) - 4:25
"Fill My Heart" (Troccoli, Montvilo) - 3:57
"May I Be His Love" (Troccoli, Madeline Stone) - 4:00
"Missing You" (Rice) - 4:28

Personnel 
 Kathy Troccoli – lead vocals 
 Brad Cole – keyboards (1, 9), programming (1, 9)
 Mark Jordan – keyboards (2)
 Michael Eckart – keyboards (3, 4, 6, 8), programming (3, 4, 6, 8)
 Dane Noel – keyboards (3, 4, 6, 8), programming (3, 4, 6, 8)
 Shane Keister – acoustic piano (5), electric piano (10)
 Brian D. Siewart – keyboards (5, 7, 10), orchestrations (5), percussion (7, 10), acoustic piano (10)
 Frank Reina – additional keyboards (8)
 Dann Huff – guitars (1), acoustic guitar (2), electric guitar (3, 4, 6)
 Richard Bredice – acoustic guitar (3, 4, 6)
 Gordon Kennedy – guitars (7, 10)
 Jerry McPherson – guitars (7, 10)
 Mike Brignardello – bass (7)
 Jimmie Lee Sloas – bass (10)
 Peter Bunetta – drums (4, 6)
 Chris McHugh – drums (7, 10)
 Tabitha Fair – backing vocals (1, 3, 4, 6, 8)
 Jackie Farris – backing vocals (1, 3)
 Ellis Hall – backing vocals (1, 3, 4)
 Kim Keyes – backing vocals (1, 3, 4, 6, 8)
 Maxayn Lewis – backing vocals (1, 3)
 Stella Payton – backing vocals (1, 3)
 Carol Perry – backing vocals (1, 3)
 Micah Wilshire – backing vocals (1, 3, 4, 6, 8, 10)
 Syreeta Wright – backing vocals (1, 3)
 Lisa Cochran – backing vocals (5, 7)
 Michael Mellett – backing vocals (5, 7, 10)
 Cindy Morgan – backing vocals (5, 7)
 Rick Kittleman – backing vocals (10)

Production
 Don Donahue – A&R 
 Brown Bannister – producer 
 Peter Bunetta – producer 
 Rick Chudacoff – producer 
 Steve Bishir – recording, mixing 
 Eric Rudd – recording 
 Eric Sarafin – mixing 
 Martin Woodlee – recording assistant, additional engineer 
 Leon Johnson – additional recording 
 James "JB" Baird – additional engineer 
 Eric Greedy – mix assistant 
 Aaron Swihart – mix assistant 
 Cornerstone Studios (Chatsworth, California) – mixing location 
 OmniSound Studios (Nashville, Tennessee) – mixing location 
 Dave Collins – mastering at A&M Mastering Studios (Hollywood, California)
 Traci Sterling Bishir – production coordinator 
 Rob Birkhead – art direction 
 Karrine Caulkins – design 
 Buddy Jackson – design 
 Russ Harrington – photography 
 Cindy Dupree – management

Critical reception 

Dacia A. Blodgett-Williams of AllMusic wrote that Troccoli "gives a nice balance between soft pop ballads and up-tempo pieces on this inspirational release. The first of ten tracks opens on an upbeat tempo with 'I Will Choose Christ' and the pace rarely lets up, even through the ballads. The title track, which is placed in the fourth position, is also a lively song. The seventh track, 'Each Moment' is a ballad with a melody that catches and requires full attention, while the eighth track is a dance worthy piece appropriately titled 'Fill My Heart.' Lots of old-fashioned gospel feel on this album even though the music is more accurately described as inspirational pop."

Tony Cummings of Cross Rhythms rated Sounds of Heaven 8 out of 10 saying that the album is "the most Christ-o-centric and with subdued production work from Peter Bunetto, Rick Chudacoff and Brown Bannister emanates a worshipful mood. Even obvious 'We Are The World'-style anthems like 'Go Light The World' are, by the standards of such material, arranged with taste while the simply arranged self-composed 'I Will Choose Christ' opener is as tenderly moving a worship ballad as you're likely to hear. Not that everything is laid back balladry, the title track features a catchy pop groove while the chunky 'Fill My Heart' has a solid backbeat."

Charts

Radio singles

References

1995 albums
Kathy Troccoli albums
Reunion Records albums